Charles Dixon (born c. 1972) is an American bodybuilder, who competes professionally since 2008. He won the Europa Phoenix Pro in 2015 and placed 10th–11th at the Mr. Olympia in 2008–2009. In 1996 he graduated from Carson–Newman University with a degree in public relations.

Competition history
2015 IFBB Europa Phoenix Pro – 1st
2015 IFBB Olympia Weekend – 7th
2015 IFBB St. Louis Pro – 1st
2015 IFBB Arnold Sports Festival – 5th
2014 IFBB Olympia Weekend – 10th
2014 IFBB Wings of Strength Chicago Pro – 1st
2014 IFBB Arnold Classic – 6th
2013 IFBB Europa Phoenix Pro – 4th
2013 IFBB New York Pro – 10th
2012 IFBB Valenti Gold Cup Pro – 3rd
2011 IFBB Iowa Pro 212 & Bikini Championship – 6th
2009 IFBB Mr. Olympia – 11th
2009 IFBB Europa Super Show & Supplement Expo – 2nd
2009 IFBB Jacksonville Pro – 4th
2008 IFBB Mr. Olympia – 10th
2008 IFBB New York Pro 202 – 4th
2008 IFBB New York Pro – 10th

References

1972 births
Living people
American bodybuilders